Titanium tetraiodide is an inorganic compound with the formula TiI4.  It is a black volatile solid, first reported by Rudolph Weber in 1863.  It is an intermediate in the van Arkel–de Boer process for the purification of titanium.

Physical properties
TiI4 is a rare molecular binary metal iodide, consisting of isolated molecules of tetrahedral Ti(IV) centers.  The Ti-I distances are 261 pm.  Reflecting its molecular character, TiI4 can be distilled without decomposition at one atmosphere; this property is the basis of its use in the van Arkel–de Boer process.  The difference in melting point between TiCl4 (m.p. -24 °C) and TiI4 (m.p. 150 °C) is comparable to the difference between the melting points of CCl4 (m.p. -23 °C) and CI4 (m.p. 168 °C), reflecting the stronger intermolecular van der Waals bonding in the iodides.

Two polymorphs of TiI4 exist, one of which is highly soluble in organic solvents. In the less soluble cubic form, the Ti-I distances are 261 pm.

Production
Three methods are well known:
1) From the elements, typically using a tube furnace at 425 °C:
Ti + 2 I2  →  TiI4
This reaction can be reversed to produce highly pure films of Ti metal.

2) Exchange reaction from titanium tetrachloride and HI.
TiCl4 + 4 HI  →  TiI4 + 4 HCl
3) Oxide-iodide exchange from aluminium iodide.
3 TiO2 + 4 AlI3  →  3 TiI4  +  2 Al2O3

Reactions
Like TiCl4 and TiBr4, TiI4 forms adducts with Lewis bases, and it can also be reduced.  When the reduction is conducted in the presence of Ti metal, one obtains polymeric Ti(III) and Ti(II) derivatives such as CsTi2I7 and the chain CsTiI3, respectively.  

TiI4 exhibits extensive reactivity toward alkenes and alkynes resulting in organoiodine derivatives.  It also effects pinacol couplings and other C-C bond-forming reactions.

References

__notoc__

Titanium(IV) compounds
Iodides
Titanium halides